Purworejo is a regency in the southern part of Central Java province in Indonesia. It covers an area of 1,034.82 km2 and had a population of 695,427 at the 2010 Census and 769,880 at the 2020 Census; the official estimate as at mid 2021 was 773,588. Its capital is the town of Purworejo.

History

Ancient Mataram Hindu Period (8th–9th century AD) 
The history of Purworejo is first recorded on Kayu Ara Hiwang inscription on 5 October 901, which is being found in Boro Wetan Village The area was originally known by the name 'Bagelen' (read /ba·gə·lɛn/) and it is now become a smaller part of the whole Purworejo regency.

In the 9th centuries, Bagelen is part of the history of the ancient Mataram Hindu civilization (See: Mataram Kingdom) which was flourished on Kedu Plain. It is estimated that within the period of Rakai Watukara Dyah Balitung, Bagelen had become the capital of the Mataram Hindu Kingdom or that it is the origin of the king as Watukara is a river name in Bagelen.

The ancient artifact being found in Bagelen is Kayu Ara Hiwang inscription which explain Shima ceremony. At that period, when a new land is being opened for economic or religious use, there will be a ceremony being held by the authorities, namely Shima ceremony. The authorities mentioned in the inscription are: Sang Ratu Bajra, who is allegedly as Rakryan Mahamantri/Mapatih Hino Sri Daksottama Bahubajrapratipaksaya, who is also the brother-in-law of Rakai Watukura Dyah Balitung and who is also later became Balitung's successor.

The ceremony mentions that the land is being freed from any tax duty, but it has the obligation to maintain the holiness of a sacred place called "parahiyangan" (which means the place of Gods). The ceremony also purified the area of Kayu Ara Hiwang of any evil's influence. Kayu Ara Hiwang area itself consists of rice fields, savanna, caves and arable land. The cave mentioned in the inscription is identified as Seplawan Cave, where a shiva gold statue is being found and therefore the second artifact within Bagelen area.

Within this period, Bagelen became a religious center where some Buddhist monks (and often skilled with martial arts) were probably lived along the Bogowonto river banks.

Mataram Sultanate (Muslim) Period (15th–16th century AD) 
During this period, the people of Bagelen is famous for becoming the special arms force for Sutawijaya, hence the beginning of its militaristic character which also said as inheritance of the martial art skills being instilled by the previous Buddhist monks from the ancient Mataram period.

Dutch Colonial Period (16th–19th century AD) 
During this period, Bagelen area was notorious of its powerful insurgent which support Prince Diponegoro throughout Java War.  Upon the defeat of Diponegoro, Bagelen was being asked from Mataram Sultanate in order to undermine the power of Bagelen's insurgent and was being integrated into Kedu Residency by the Dutch Colonial ruler. The new town, called Poerworedjo (new spelling: Purworejo) is being designed by a Dutch architect by adopting traditional Javanese architecture and tradition. The Dutch implemented indirect rule, which is reflected in its town architecture, where the regent is from the local leader (Raden Adipati Cokronegoro Pertama) and the co-ruler (the regent assistant) is always a Dutch. This new town was also served as Dutch military base camp that housed the Dutch Black Colonial Armed Forces from West Africa.
Being a Dutch military base, several Dutch residents were born, lived and died in Purworejo, leaving genealogical records and memoirs in the regency.

Some Dutch colonial buildings are still in a good shape until now as of Regency Official House (1840), a church which still become GPIB Church (1879), Kweekschool (1915), Train Station, Bank, Hospital.
During this period, there were 2 main religious figures: a Muslim preacher (mubaligh) kyai Imam Pura and a Javanese Christian Evangelist, Kyai Sadrach. This is the evidence that in Purworejo, Muslim and Christians are being accepted harmoniously by its people.

Modern Indonesian period 
In the modern day Indonesia, Purworejo produce skilled work force in the area of government, education and military. The prominent general from Purworejo is Sarwo Edhie Wibowo who is also the father-in-law of President Susilo Bambang Yudhoyono. There are also several other notable general arms forces, government officials, ministers and lecturers as being listed in the notables from Purworejo.

Purworejo is recently more well known as the town of retirement. As the economic and government activities of modern Indonesia is centered in Jakarta, the majority of Purworejo citizens are urged to work in Jakarta or in other parts of Indonesia or even worldwide. However, there is also an urge for Purworejo citizen to repatriate and to build retirement residences in Purworejo.
Because of its reputation as a retirement town in the modern day, its inheritance as a Dutch town and its ancient inheritance of Buddhist religious center, Purworejo is relatively a peaceful town with vast main roads, big old trees on both sides, regular squares of town blocks and its preserved Dutch buildings. The wider area of Purworejo Regency mainly has agriculture and livestock activities while some medium-sized, export oriented industrial activities (traditional furniture, textile and sports equipment) is being established in the southern part of the region.

Administrative districts 
Purworejo Regency is divided into the following sixteen districts (kecamatan), tabulated below with their areas and their populations at the 2010 Census and the 2020 Census, together with the official estimate as at mid 2021. The table also includes the locations of the district administrative centres, the number of administrative villages (rural desa and urban kelurahan) in each district, and its post code.

Notes: (a) There are 469 rural villages (desa) and 25 urban villages (kelurahan); the latter comprises 14 in Purworejo District, 6 in Kutoarjo District, 3 in Banyuurip District, 1 in Bayan District anbd 1 in Gebang District. (b) except the kelurahan of Purworejo, which has a post code of 54151. (c) except the kelurahan of Kutoarjo, which has a post code of 54251. (d) except the village of Kedungsari, which has a post code of 54116. (e) except the village of Kemiri, which has a post code of 54262.

Transportation

Airport 
The airport closest to the town is Adisucipto International Airport which is approximately within 1.5 hours driving distance.
With the development of Yogyakarta International Airport near the border of Jogjakarta and Purworejo, it will only take 30 minutes to the airport.

Rail 
The complete schedule can be found at Kutoarjo Station Schedules. Some popular schedules:

Intercity routes 
 Taksaka (executive class): Yogyakarta – Kutoarjo – Jakarta
 Argo Lawu (executive class): Jakarta – Kutoarjo – Solo
 Argo Dwipangga (executive class): Jakarta – Kutoarjo – Solo
 Argo Wilis (executive class): Bandung – Kutoarjo – Surabaya
 Turangga (executive class): Bandung – Kutoarjo – Surabaya
 Sawunggalih Utama (executive and business class): Kutoarjo – Jakarta
 Lodaya route (executive and business class): Solo – Kutoarjo – Bandung
 Kutojaya Utara (economy class): Kutoarjo – Jakarta
 Bogowonto (economy AC class): Yogyakarta – Kutoarjo – Jakarta
 Kutojaya Selatan (economy class): Kutoarjo – Bandung
 Gaya Baru Malam Selatan (economy class): Jakarta – Kutoarjo – Surabaya
 Sancaka Utara (executive and business class): Kutoarjo – Surabaya

Commuter Routes 
Prambanan Express commuter train serves 3 cities: Solo, Yogyakarta and Purworejo (Kutoarjo)

Roads 
There are several coach provider which serve route from Purworejo to main cities in Java e.g.
 Sumber Alam = Purworejo – Jakarta
 Efisiensi = Purwokerto –  Yogjakarta through Purworejo

Tourism 
Purworejo has not been fully marketed as a tourism area, although it has natural attractions including its south-western range of Menoreh hills with its caves (Seplawan cave), its southern beaches (Ketawang, Congot, Jatimalang) and its northern picturesque scenery of two active volcanoes Sumbing and Sundoro and its mountainous range with its waterfalls to the northern-east (Bruno).

Sports & Amusement Park 
Sports centres and activities that can be done in Purworejo

Swimming pools & Waterpark 
 Artha Tirta
 Kedung Kebo (Alam Tirta)
 Sumber Adventure Center (SAC) Waterpark

Car Free Day 
Every Sunday morning between 6AM to 10 AM the roads surrounding 1 km-square town square (alun-alun) is being closed from traffic and the town's resident freely walk/run/cycling/playing football/eat/do all sort of relaxing morning activities around the square.

Town Sports Center 
GOR WR Supratman

Futsal (Mini football) centers 
There are five futsal halls around the town

Cycling 
Purworejo landscape is ideal for cycling as the terrain varies with easy no elevation long routes along rice fields, to moderate challenge with some elevation around foothills, and the more difficult uphill routes to Menoreh hills at 300–800 meters above the sea level.

Gallery of Dutch Colonial's Poerworedjo

Gallery of today's Purworejo

Notable people

Figures of Indonesian Independence 
 Mr. Wilopo; the 7th Prime Minister of Indonesia (1952–1953)
 Gen.(Ret.) Benedictus Oerip Soemohardjo; founder of Indonesian National Army (TNI); National Hero of Indonesia
 Mr. Kasman Singodimedjo; Attorney General (Indonesia) (1945–1946); Junior Minister of Justice in the Second Amir Sjarifuddin Cabinet (1947–1948); National Hero of Indonesia
 Wage Rudolf Soepratman (in debate); the writer of Indonesian national anthem "Indonesia Raya"
 Winoto Danoe Asmoro; Presidential House Chief-of-Staff for Ir. Sukarno (the 1st President of Indonesia)

Military Figures 
 Gen. Ahmad Yani; Commander of the Indonesian Army; National Hero of Indonesia; killed by soldiers in the 1965 coup attempt
 Lt.Col.(Ret.) ; Pioneer of helicopter design in Indonesia
 Lt.Gen.(Ret.) Sarwo Edhie Wibowo; Commander of RPKAD (Kopassus, 1964-1967); the father-in-law of Susilo Bambang Yudhoyono (the 6th President of Indonesia)
 Gen.(Ret.) Endriartono Sutarto; Commander-in-Chief of ABRI (Indonesian National Armed Forces, 2002–2006)
 Maj.Gen.(Ret.) ; Commander-in-Chief of Kodam Jaya (Pangdam Jaya, 2000–2001)
 Maj.Gen.(Ret.) ; Force Commander of the United Nations Mission for the Referendum in Western Sahara (MINURSO, 2013-2015); Indonesian Ambassador for Venezuela (2020-present)

High-Ranking Officials 
 Sarino Mangunpranoto; Ministry of Education and Culture (Indonesia) (1956–1957, 1966–1967)
 Hj. Ani Yudhoyono, S.I.P.; First Lady of Indonesia (2004–2014); the wife of Lt.Gen.(Ret.) Dr. Susilo B. Yudhoyono; the daughter of Lt.Gen.(Ret.) Sarwo Edhie Wibowo
 Ir.
 Drs. , M.P.A.; Secretary of the Ministry of Administrative and Bureaucratic Reform of Indonesia (2014-present)

Academia/Researchers 
 Prof. Em. Dr. Hendrik Kern; Professor of Linguistics at the Leiden University; an orientalist
 Prof. ; Rector of Sebelas Maret University (1986–1990); an expert of philosophy; the first Doctor of Philosophy graduated from Gadjah Mada University (UGM)
 Prof. Dr.rer.soc.
 Prof. (Asst.) Dr. Corinthias P. M. Sianipar; an expert of appropriate technology, systems theory, and sustainability science at Kyoto University, Japan
 R.Ng. Tjitrowardojo, M.D.; one of the earliest native-Indonesian (bumiputra) lecturers at STOVIA; the great-grandfather of B.J. Habibie (the 3rd President of Indonesia); Regional Public Hospital of Purworejo (RSUD) is named after him
 Dr. André J.G.H. Kostermans; Dutch and Indonesian botanist
 Dr. Tafsir Nurchamid, Ak. M.Si.; Vice Rector II of the University of Indonesia (UI, 2007–2012)
 Dr. Yenti Garnasih, S.H., M.H.; an expert of criminal law and special criminal offenses at the Trisakti University; a member of KPK selection committee (2015)
 Dr. Supriyanto Rohadi, M.Si.; an expert of seismology at the Indonesian Meteorology, Climatology, and Geophysical Agency (BMKG); current Head of Geophysics Research at the BMKG
 Dr. Kris Sunarto, M.Si.; former cartography expert at the Indonesian Agency for Geospatial Information (BIG/Bakosurtanal)
 Dr.-Ing. Andry Widyowijatnoko, M.T., IAI.; an expert of building architecture at the Bandung Institute of Technology (ITB)
 Dr.Eng. Imam Achmad Sadisun, S.T., M.T.; an expert of applied geology at the Bandung Institute of Technology (ITB)
 Dr. Taufiq A. Kurniawan; an expert in electrical engineering at the University of Indonesia

Artists/Sportmen 
 Jan Toorop; Dutch painter
 Drs. Bambang Irawan; an industrial designer; former lecturer at the Sepuluh Nopember Institute of Technology (ITS)
 ; traditional Indonesian puppet (wayang) master
 Herman Veenstra; Dutch water polo athlete
 Karel Heijting; Dutch football player
 Danurwindo; Indonesian football player (1969–1982); Head coach of Indonesian national football team (1995–1996)
 ; an Indonesian actress

Religious Pioneers 
 ; a Muslim cleric
 Syekh Imam Puro; a Muslim cleric
 Kyai Sadrach; a Javanese Christian evangelist

References

Footnotes

Bibliography

External links